Charles Cornwallis, 2nd Marquess Cornwallis (19 October 1774 – 9 August 1823), styled Viscount Brome until 1805, was a British Tory politician. He served as Master of the Buckhounds between 1807 and 1823.

Background
Cornwallis was the only son of General Charles Cornwallis, 1st Marquess Cornwallis, by his wife Jemima (née Jones). His mother died when he was four years old. He was educated at Eton and St John's College, Cambridge, receiving his M.A. in 1795.

Political career
In 1795 Cornwallis was returned to parliament as one of two representatives for Eye (alongside his uncle William Cornwallis), a seat he held until 1796. He then sat as a Knight of the Shire for Suffolk until 1805, when he succeeded his father in the marquessate and entered the House of Lords. In 1807 he was appointed Master of the Buckhounds, a post he held until his death fourteen years later.

Family
Lord Cornwallis married Lady Louisa Gordon, daughter of Alexander Gordon, 4th Duke of Gordon, in 1797. They had five daughters, including Lady Jane Cornwallis, wife of Richard Griffin, 3rd Baron Braybrooke, and Lady Jemima Cornwallis, wife of Edward Eliot, 3rd Earl of St Germans. He died in August 1823, aged 48. The marquessate became extinct on his death while he was succeeded in his remaining titles by his uncle, the Right Reverend James Cornwallis.

References

|-

1774 births
1823 deaths
People educated at Eton College
Alumni of St John's College, Cambridge
Members of the Parliament of Great Britain for English constituencies
British MPs 1790–1796
British MPs 1796–1800
Members of the Parliament of the United Kingdom for English constituencies
UK MPs 1801–1802
UK MPs 1802–1806
Cornwallis, M2
Charles
Marquesses Cornwallis
Masters of the Buckhounds
Barons Cornwallis
Tory members of the Parliament of Great Britain